An ionotropic effect is the effect of a transmitter substance or hormone that activates or deactivates ionotropic receptors (ligand-gated ion channels). The effect can be either positive or negative, specifically a depolarization or a hyperpolarization respectively. This term is commonly confused with an inotropic effect, which refers to a change in the force of contraction (e.g. in heart muscle) produced by transmitter substances or hormones.

Examples
This term could be used to describe the action of acetylcholine on nicotinic receptors, glutamate on NMDA receptors or GABA on GABAa receptors.

References

Membrane biology
Electrophysiology
Neurochemistry
Molecular neuroscience